Guillaume Gauclin (born 17 June 1981) is a French professional footballer who most recently played as a goalkeeper for Championnat National 2 club Haguenau. for which he is the captain.

Whilst at Guingamp, then in Ligue 2, Gauclin played in the 2009 Coupe de France Final, in which they beat Rennes.

Honours
Guingamp
 Coupe de France: 2008–09

References

External links
 
 
 

1981 births
Living people
Association football goalkeepers
French footballers
Ligue 2 players
Championnat National players
Championnat National 2 players
Championnat National 3 players
En Avant Guingamp players
Wasquehal Football players
FC Lorient players
Vannes OC players
RC Strasbourg Alsace players
SC Schiltigheim players
FCSR Haguenau players